From Day 1 is the debut studio album by American hip hop group Travis Porter. It was released on May 29, 2012, by Porter House Music Group and RCA Records. The album was to be released under Jive Records. After RCA Music Group shut it down along with Arista Records and J Records, all prior signees (Travis Porter included) switched over to the RCA Records brand.

The album features guest appearances from 2 Chainz, Tyga, Jeremih, Mac Miller and Mike Posner with production handled by Diplo, J.U.S.T.I.C.E. League, B Beck, Lil Lody, Lil' C, Kane Beatz, FKi, J Mike, M16, and KP on Da Beat.

Track listing

Samples credits
"Ayy Ladies" contains a sample of "I Need a Hot Girl", performed and written by Byron Thomas, Brian Williams, Christopher Dorsey, Virgil Tab, Jr., and Dwayne Carter, Jr.

Charts

References

2012 debut albums
Albums produced by Diplo
Albums produced by J.U.S.T.I.C.E. League
RCA Records albums
Albums produced by FKi (production team)
Albums produced by Southside (record producer)
Albums produced by Lil' C (record producer)